The Defence Services College is a National school established on 17 January 2007 for the children of military and police personnel, within the refurbished Rifle Barracks building built in 1860 as part of the regimental headquarters of the Ceylon Rifle Regiment at Rifle Green, Slave Island, Colombo.

External links
Official website
National School opened for the children of members of Sri Lanka's Armed Forces and Police January 17, 2007, ColomboPage

National schools in Sri Lanka
Military of Sri Lanka
Military education and training in Sri Lanka
Schools in Colombo
2007 establishments in Sri Lanka